Sofia Asgatovna Gubaidulina (born 24 October 1931) is a Soviet-Russian composer and an established international figure. Major orchestras around the world have commissioned and performed her works. She is considered one of the foremost Russian composers of the second half of the 20th century.

Family 
Gubaidulina was born in Chistopol, Tatar Autonomous Soviet Socialist Republic (now the Republic of Tatarstan), Russian SFSR, to an ethnically mixed family of a Volga Tatar father and an ethnic Russian mother. Her father, Asgat Masgudovich Gubaidulin, was an engineer and her mother, Fedosiya Fyodorovna (née Yelkhova), was a teacher. After discovering music at the age of 5, Gubaidulina immersed herself in ideas of composition. While studying at the Children’s Music School with Ruvim Poliakov, Gubaidulina discovered spiritual ideas and found them in the works of composers such as Bach, Mozart, and Beethoven. Gubaidulina quickly learned to keep her spiritual interests secret from her parents and other adults since the Soviet Union was against any religious ideas. These early experiences with music and spiritual ideas led her to treat the two domains of thought as conceptually similar and explains her later striving to write music expressing and exploring spiritually based concepts.

Gubaidulina has married three times.

Career
She studied composition and piano at the Kazan Conservatory, graduating in 1954. During her early conservatory years, Western contemporary music was banned nearly entirely from study, an unusual exception being Bartók. Raids even took place in the dormitory halls, where searches were conducted for banned scores, Stravinsky being the most infamous and sought after. Gubaidulina and her peers procured and studied modern Western scores nonetheless. "We knew Ives, Cage, we actually knew everything on the sly." In Moscow she undertook further studies at the Conservatory with Nikolay Peyko until 1959, and then with Vissarion Shebalin until 1963. She was awarded a Stalin fellowship. Her music was deemed "irresponsible" during her studies in Soviet Russia, due to its exploration of alternative tunings. She was supported, however, by Dmitri Shostakovich, who in evaluating her final examination encouraged her to continue down her path despite others calling it "mistaken". She was allowed to express her modernism in various scores she composed for documentary films, including the 1963 production, On Submarine Scooters, a 70mm film shot in the unique Kinopanorama widescreen format. She also composed the score to the well-known Russian animated picture "Adventures of Mowgli" (a rendition of Rudyard Kipling's Jungle Book).

In the mid-1970s Gubaidulina founded Astreja, a folk-instrument improvisation group with fellow composers Viktor Suslin and Vyacheslav Artyomov. In 1979, she was blacklisted as one of the "Khrennikov's Seven" at the Sixth Congress of the Union of Soviet Composers for unapproved participation in some festivals of Soviet music in the West.

Gubaidulina became better known abroad during the early 1980s through Gidon Kremer's championing of her violin concerto Offertorium. "She sprang to international fame in the late 1980s". She later composed an homage to T. S. Eliot, using the text from the poet's Four Quartets. In 2000, Gubaidulina, along with Tan Dun, Osvaldo Golijov, and Wolfgang Rihm, was commissioned by the Internationale Bachakademie Stuttgart to write a piece for the Passion 2000 project in commemoration of Johann Sebastian Bach. Her contribution was the Johannes-Passion. In 2002 she followed this by the Johannes-Ostern ("Easter according to John"), commissioned by Hannover Rundfunk. The two works together form a "diptych" on the death and resurrection of Christ, her largest work to date. Invited by Walter Fink, she was the 13th composer featured in the annual Komponistenporträt of the Rheingau Musik Festival in 2003, the first female composer of the series. Her work The Light at the End preceded Beethoven's Symphony No. 9 in the 2005 proms. In 2007 her second violin concerto In Tempus Praesens was performed at the Lucerne Festival by Anne-Sophie Mutter. Its creation has been depicted in Jan Schmidt-Garre's film Sophia – Biography of a Violin Concerto.

Since 1992, Gubaidulina has lived in Hamburg, Germany. She is a member of the musical academies in Frankfurt, Hamburg and the Royal Swedish Academy of Music.

Aesthetic
For Gubaidulina, music was an escape from the socio-political atmosphere of Soviet Russia. For this reason, she associated music with human transcendence and mystical spiritualism, which manifests itself as a longing inside the soul of humanity to locate its true being, a longing she continually tries to capture in her works. These abstract religious and mystical associations are concretized in Gubaidulina's compositions in various ways, such as writing in bowing directions that cause the performer to draw a crucifix in the seventh movement of her Ten Preludes For Solo Cello. Gubaidulina is a devout member of the Russian Orthodox church. The influence of electronic music and improvisational techniques is exemplified in her unusual combination of contrasting elements, novel instrumentation, and the use of traditional Russian folk instruments in her solo and chamber works, such as De profundis for bayan, Et expecto, sonata for bayan, and In croce for cello and organ or bayan. The koto, a traditional Japanese instrument is featured in her work In the Shadow of the Tree, in which one solo player performs three different instrument—koto, bass koto, and chang. The Canticle of the Sun is a cello concerto/choral hybrid, dedicated to Mstislav Rostropovich. The use of the lowest possible registers on the cello opens new possibilities for the instrument while the limited use of chorus also adds a mystical ambience to the work.

Another influence of improvisation techniques can be found in her fascination with percussion instruments. She associates the indeterminate nature of percussive timbres with the mystical longing and the potential freedom of human transcendence. In an interview with the modern British composer Ivan Moody, Gubaidulina provides an explanation for how percussion is utilized in her works to show spiritualism. She says,
... percussion has an acoustic cloud around it, a cloud that cannot be analyzed. These instruments are at the boundary between palpable reality and the subconscious, because they have these acoustics. Their purely physical characteristics, of the timpani and membranophones and so on, when the skin vibrates, or the wood is touched, respond. They enter into that layer of our consciousness which is not logical, they are at the boundary between the conscious and the subconscious.

She was also preoccupied by experimentation with non-traditional methods of sound production, and as already mentioned, with unusual combinations of instruments, e.g. Concerto for Bassoon and Low Strings (1975), Detto – I, sonata for organ and percussion (1978), The Garden of Joy and Sorrow for flute, harp and viola (1980), and Descensio for 3 trombones, 3 percussionists, harp, harpsichord/celesta and celesta/piano (1981).

Gubaidulina notes that the two composers to whom she experiences a constant devotion are J. S. Bach and Anton Webern, although she had periods of devotion to Wagner, the Second Viennese School, and 16th century music, most notably Gesualdo da Venosa and Josquin des Prez. Among some non-musical influences of considerable import are Carl Jung (Swiss thinker and founder of analytical psychology) and Nikolai Berdyaev (Russian religious philosopher, whose works were forbidden in the USSR, but nevertheless found and studied by the composer).

Style
A profoundly spiritual person, Gubaidulina defines "re-ligio" as re-legato or as restoration of the connection between oneself and the Absolute. She finds this re-connection through the artistic process and has developed a number of musical symbols to express her ideals. She does it through narrower means of intervallic and rhythmic relationship within the primary material of her works, by seeking to discover the depth and mysticism of the sound, as well as on a larger scale, through carefully thought architecture of musical form.

Gubaidulina's music is characterised by the use of unusual instrumental combinations. In Erwartung combines percussion (bongos, güiros, temple blocks, cymbals and tam-tams among others) and saxophone quartet.

Melodically, Gubaidulina's is characterized by the frequent use of intense chromatic motives rather than long melodic phrases. She often treats musical space as a means of attaining unity with the divine—a direct line to God—concretely manifest by the lack of striation in pitch space. She achieves this through the use of micro-chromaticism (i.e., quarter tones) and frequent glissandi, exemplifying the lack of "steps" to the divine. This notion is furthered by her extreme dichotomy characterized by chromatic space vs. diatonic space viewed as symbols of darkness vs. light and human/mundane vs. divine/heavenly. Additionally, the use of short motivic segments allows her to create a musical narrative that is seemingly open-ended and disjunct rather than smooth. Finally, another important melodic technique can be seen with her use of harmonics. When talking about her piece Rejoice!, sonata for violin and violoncello, Gubaidulina explains,
The possibility for string instruments to derive pitches of various heights at one and the same place on the string can be experienced in music as the transition to another plane of existence. And that is joy.
Rejoice! uses harmonics to represent joy as an elevated state of spiritual thought.

Harmonically, Gubaidulina's music resists traditional tonal centers and triadic structures in favor of pitch clusters and intervallic design arising from the contrapuntal interaction between melodic voices. For example, in the Cello Concerto Detto-2 (1972) she notes that a strict and progressive intervallic process occurs, in which the opening section utilizes successively wider intervals that become narrower toward the last section.

Rhythmically, Gubaidulina places significant stress on the fact that temporal ratios should not be limited to local figuration; rather, the temporality of the musical form should be the defining feature of rhythmic character. As Gerard McBurney states:
In conversation she is most keen to stress that she cannot accept the idea (a frequent post-serial one) of rhythm or duration as the material of a piece. ... To her, rhythm is nowadays a generating principle as, for instance, the cadence was to tonal composers of the Classical period; it therefore cannot be the surface material of a work. ... [S]he expresses her impatience with Messiaen, whose use of rhythmic modes to generate local imagery, she feels, restricts the effectiveness of rhythm as an underlying formal level of the music.

To this end, Gubaidulina often devises durational ratios in order to create the temporal forms for her compositions. Specifically, she often utilizes elements of the Fibonacci sequence or the golden ratio, in which each succeeding element is equal to the sum of the two preceding elements (i.e., 0, 1, 1, 2, 3, 5, 8, etc.). This numerical layout represents the balanced nature in her music through a sense of cell multiplication between live and non-live substances. She believes that this abstract theory is the foundation of her personal musical expression. The golden ratio between the sections are always marked by some musical event, and the composer explores her fantasy fully in articulating this moment.

The first work in which Gubaidulina experiments with this concept of proportionality is Perceptions for Soprano, Baritone, and Seven String Instruments (1981, rev. 1983–86). The 12th movement, "Montys Tod" (Monty's Death), uses the Fibonacci series in its rhythmical structure with the number of quarter notes in individual episodes corresponding to numbers from Fibonacci series.

In the early 1980s, she began to use the Fibonacci sequence as a way of structuring the form of the work. Her use of the Fibonacci sequence to determine phrase and rhythm length replaces traditional form, creating a new form which to her is more spiritually in tune. Gubaidulina also experimented with other like series, including the Lucas Series which begins by adding 2 instead of 1 to the initial value; the only thing setting it apart from Fibonacci. These forms are still fluid, as every other movement in her symphony Stimmen... Verstummen... follows the Fibonacci form. "It is a game!", she would claim. Later the Lucas and Evangelist series, sequences derived from that of Fibonacci, were added to her repertoire.

Valentina Kholopova, Gubaidulina's close friend and colleague, outlined the composer's form techniques in detail. In addition to using the Fibonacci among other number sequences, Kholopova describes Gubaidulina's use of "expression parameters"; being articulation, melody, rhythm, texture, and composition. The name suggests the immediate effects of each parameter on the listener. Each of these exists on a scale of consonance to dissonance, together forming the "parameter complex". For example, she describes a consonant articulation as legato, and a dissonant one as staccato, but each of these can change from piece to piece.

According to Kholopova, music from before the 20th century left the responsibility of articulation to the performer, while now it begs to be more heavily illustrated by the composer. She also cites the writings of Viktor Bobrovski on his research on macrothemes, or central ideas that may occupy larger frames of time, such as entire sections of a piece. With this scale, pieces such as her Concordanza assume a mosaic form held together by Fibonacci-derived groupings of expression parameters, "modulating" between consonance and dissonance. This technique appears most clearly in her Ten Preludes for Solo Cello as six of its movements are names after modulation between parameters, and two being single parameters. Kholopova proposed that this scale could be used to analyze the music of any 20th century composer focused on texture, timbre and color, and that it is but one way to analyze music, signalling a continuing progression, catalyzed, according to Gubaidulina, by Webern.

Piano music

Gubaidulina's entire piano output belongs to her earlier compositional period and consists of the following works: Chaconne (1962), Piano Sonata (1965), Musical Toys (1968), Toccata-Troncata (1971), Invention (1974) and Piano Concerto "Introitus" (1978). Some of the titles reveal her interest in baroque genres and the influence of J. S. Bach.

The Piano Sonata is dedicated to Henrietta Mirvis, a pianist greatly admired by the composer. The work follows the classical formal structure in 3 movements: Allegro (sonata form), Adagio, and Allegretto. Four motives (pitch sets) are utilized throughout the entire sonata, which also constitute the cyclical elements upon which the rhetoric of the piece is constructed. Each motive is given a particular name: "spring", "struggle", "consolation", and "faith".

There are two elements in the primary thematic complex of the first movement: (1) a "swing" theme, characterized by syncopation and dotted rhythms and (2) a chord progression, juxtaposing minor and major seconds over an ostinato pattern in the left hand. The slower secondary theme introduces a melodic element associated with the ostinato element of the previous theme.

In the development section, these sets are explored melodically, while the dotted rhythm figure gains even more importance. In the recapitulation, the chord progression of the first thematic complex is brought to the higher registers, preparing the coda based on secondary theme cantabile element, which gradually broadens.

The second movement shifts to a different expressive world. A simple ternary form with a cadenza–AB (cadenza) A, the B section represents an acoustic departure as the chromatic figurations in the left hand, originating in section A, are muted.

In the cadenza the performer improvises within a framework given by the composer, inviting a deeper exploration of the secrets of sound. It consists of two alternating elements– open-sounding strings, stroke by fingers, with no pitch determination, and muted articulation of the strings in the bass register—separated by rests marked with fermatas. The third movement is constructed of 7 episodes, in which there is a continuous liberation of energy accumulated during the previous movement.

Two distinct aspects of the sonata—the driving force and the meditative state—can be seen through the architecture of the work as portraying the image of the cross. The first movement is related to the "horizontal" line, which symbolizes human experience while the second movement reflects the "vertical" line, which represents man's striving for full realization in the Divine. The meeting point of these two lines in music happens at the end of second movement, and that reflects transformation of the human being at crossing these two dimensions. The third movement "celebrates the newly obtained freedom of the spirit".

The Steinway grand piano she has in her home was a gift from Rostropovich.

Awards and recognition 
Prix de Monaco (1987)
Premio Franco Abbiati (1991)
Heidelberger Künstlerinnenpreis (1991)
Russian State Prize (1992)
Koussevitzky International Record Award (in 1989 and 1994)
Ludwig-Spohr-Preis der Stadt Braunschweig (1995)
Kulturpreis des Kreises Pinneberg (1997)
Praemium Imperiale in Japan (1998)
Sonning Award in Denmark (1999)
Preis der Stiftung Bibel und Kultur (1999)
Goethe-Medaille der Stadt Weimar (2001) 
Moscow Silenzio-Preis (2001)
Polar Music Prize in Sweden (2002) 
Great Distinguished Service Cross of the Order of Merit of the Federal Republic of Germany (2002)
Living Composer Prize of the Cannes Classical Awards in 2003
Europäischen Kulturpreis (2005)
Russian Cultural Prize "Triumph" (2007)
Bach Prize of the Free and Hanseatic City of Hamburg (2007)
Honour Prize of the Moscow Regiment and the International Council of Russian Compatriots "The Compatriot of the Year – 2007". 

In 2001 she became honour professor of the Kazan Conservatory. In 2005 she was elected as a foreign honorary member of the American Academy of Arts and Letters. In 2009, she became Dr. honoris causa of Yale University.

In 2011 she was awarded a Doctor of Humane Letters honorary degree from the University of Chicago.

On 4 October 2013, Gubaidulina became the recipient of the Golden Lion for Lifetime Achievement for the Music section of the Venice Biennale.

She has won the BBVA Foundation Frontiers of Knowledge Award (2016) in the contemporary music category. The jury in its citation praised the "outstanding musical and personal qualities" of the Russian composer, and the "spiritual quality" of her work.

On 27 February 2017, Gubaidulina was awarded an honorary doctor of music degree by the New England Conservatory, in Boston.

Her 90th birthday in October 2021 was celebrated by the Gewandhaus Orchestra of Leipzig's release of three of her pieces. She was also celebrated in a week of chamber and orchestral music.  In November, to mark the occasion, she was selected as Composer of the Week on the long running show of the same name on BBC Radio 3.

Works

Orchestral
Fairytale Poem for orchestra (1971)
Revue Music for symphony orchestra and jazz band (1976, rev. 1995, 2002)
Te Salutant, capriccio for large orchestra (1978)
Stimmen... Verstummen... symphony in twelve movements (1986)
Pro et Contra for large orchestra (1989)
The Unasked Answer (Antwort ohne Frage) collage for three orchestras (1989)
Stufen for orchestra and 7 reciters (1992)
Figures of Time (Фигуры времени) for large orchestra (1994)
The Rider on the White Horse for large orchestra and organ (2002)
The Light of the End (Свет конца) for large orchestra (2003)
Feast During a Plague for large orchestra (2006)
Der Zorn Gottes for orchestra (2020)

Concertante
Detto II for cello and ensemble (1972)
Concerto for bassoon and low strings (1975)
Introitus concerto for piano and chamber orchestra (1978)
Offertorium (Жертвоприношение) concerto for violin and orchestra (1980, rev. 1982, 1986)
Sieben Worte for cello, bayan, and strings (1982)
And: The Feast is in Full Procession (И: Празднество в разгаре) for cello and orchestra (1993)
Music for Flute, Strings, and Percussion (1994)
Impromptu for flute (flute and alto flute), violin, and strings (1996)
Concerto for viola and orchestra (1996)
The Canticle of the Sun of St Francis of Assisi for cello, chamber choir and percussion (1997)
Two Paths: A Dedication to Mary and Martha for two viola solo and orchestra (1998)
Im Schatten des Baumes (В тени под деревом) for koto, bass koto, zheng, and orchestra (1998)
Under the Sign of Scorpio variants on six hexachords for bayan and large orchestra (2003)
...The Deceitful Face of Hope and Despair for flute and orchestra (2005)
In Tempus Praesens, concerto for violin and orchestra (2007)
Glorious Percussion, concerto for percussion and orchestra (2008)
Fachwerk, concerto for bayan, percussion and strings (2009)
Warum? for flute, clarinet and string orchestra (2014)
Concerto for violin, cello and bayan (2017)
Dialog: Ich und Du, concerto for violin and orchestra (2018)

Vocal/choral
Phacelia, vocal cycle for soprano and orchestra based on Mikhail Prishvin's poem (1956)
Night in Memphis, cantata for mezzo-soprano, orchestra and male choir on tape (1968)
Rubaijat, cantata for baryton and chamber ensemble (1969)
Roses for soprano and piano (1972)
Counting Rhymes for voice and piano (1973)
Hour of the Soul poem by Marina Tsvetaeva for large wind orchestra and mezzo-soprano/contralto (1974), for percussion, mezzo-soprano, and large orchestra (1976)
Laudatio Pacis, oratorio for soprano, alto, tenor, bass, speaker, 3 mixed choirs and large orchestra without strings (1975)
Perception for soprano, baritone (speaking voices) and 7 string instruments (1981, rev. 1983, 1986)
Hommage à Marina Tsvetayeva for a cappella choir (1984)
Letter to the Poetess Rimma Dalo for soprano and cello (1985)
Ein Walzerpass nach Johann Strauss for soprano and octet, also arranged for piano and string quintet (1987)
Hommage à T.S. Eliot for soprano and octet (1987)
Two Songs on German Folk Poetry for (mezzo-)soprano, flute, harpsichord and cello (1988)
Jauchzt vor Gott for mixed choir and organ (1989)
Alleluja for mixed chorus, boy soprano, organ and large orchestra (1990)
Aus dem Stundenbuch on a text of Rainer Maria Rilke for cello, orchestra, male choir, and a woman speaker (1991)
Lauda for alto, tenor, baritone, narrator, mixed choir, and large orchestra (1991)
Jetzt immer Schnee (Теперь всегда снега) on verses of Gennadi Aigi for chamber ensemble and chamber choir (1993)
Ein Engel for contralto and double bass (1994)
Aus den Visionen der Hildegard von Bingen for contralto (1994)
Galgenlieder à 3 fifteen pieces for mezzo-soprano, percussion, and contrabass (1996)
Galgenlieder à 5 fourteen pieces for mezzo-soprano, flute, percussion, bayan, and contrabass (1996)
Sonnengesang, St. Francis of Assisi’s Canticle of the Sun for violoncello, mixed choir and percussion (1997)
Johannes-Passion for soprano, tenor, baritone, bass, two mixed choirs, organ, and large orchestra (2000)
Johannes-Ostern for soprano, tenor, baritone, bass, two mixed choirs, organ, and large orchestra (2001)
O Komm, Heiliger Geist for soprano, bass, mixed choir and orchestra (2015)
Über Liebe und Hass for soprano, tenor, baritone, bass, two mixed choirs and orchestra, in 9 movements (2015, rev. 2016) and in 15 movements (2016, rev. 2018)

Solo instrumental
Serenade for guitar (1960)
Chaconne for piano (1963)
Piano Sonata (1965)
Toccata for guitar (1969)
Musical Toys for piano (1969)
Toccata-Troncata for piano (1971)
Ten Preludes for cello (1974), also version as Eight Etudes for double bass (2009)
Invention for piano (1974)
Hell und Dunkel for organ (1976)
Sonatina for flute (1978)
De Profundis for bayan (1978)
Et Exspecto, sonata for bayan (1986)
Ritorno perpetuo for harpsichord (1997)
Cadenza for bayan (2003, rev. 2011)

Chamber/ensemble
Quintet for piano, two violins, viola, and cello (1957)
Allegro Rustico for flute and piano (1963)
Five Etudes for harp, double bass and percussion (1965)
Pantomime for double bass and piano (1966)
Musical Toys fourteen piano pieces for children (1969)
Vivente – Non Vivente for electronics (1970)
Concordanza for chamber ensemble (1971)
String Quartet No. 1 (1971)
Music for Harpsichord and Percussion Instruments from Mark Pekarsky’s Collection (1971, rev. 1973)
Rumore e silenzio for percussion and harpsichord (1974)
Quattro for two trumpets and two trombones (1974)
Sonata for double bass and piano (1975)
Two Ballads for two trumpets and piano (1976)
Dots, Lines and Zigzag for bass clarinet and piano (1976)
Trio for three trumpets (1976)
Lied ohne Worte (Songs without words) for trumpet and piano (1977)
On Tatar Folk Themes for domra and piano (1977)
Duo sonata for two bassoons (1977)
Lamento for tuba and piano (1977)
Misterioso for 7 percussionists (1977)
Quartet for four flutes (1977)
Detto I, sonata for organ and percussion (1978)
Sounds of the Forest for flute and piano (1978)
Two Pieces for horn and piano (1979)
In Croce for cello and organ (1979), for bayan and cello (1991)
Jubilatio for 4 percussionists (1979)
Garten von Freuden und Traurigkeiten for flute, viola, harp and narrator (1980)
Descensio for 3 trombones, 3 percussionists, harp, harpsichord and piano (1981)
Rejoice!, sonata for violin and cello (1981)
Swan, Crab and Pike, march for brass ensemble and percussion (1982)
In the Beginning There was Rhythm for seven percussionists (1984)
Quasi hoquetus for viola, bassoon, and piano (1984)
String Quartet No. 2 (1987), appears on Short Stories
String Quartet No. 3 (1987)
String Trio (1988)
Ein Walzerpass nach Johann Strauss for piano and string quintet, arranged from version for soprano and octet (1989)
Hörst Du uns, Luigi? Schau mal, welchen Tanz eine einfache Holzrassel für Dich vollführt (Слышишь ты нас, Луиджи? Вот танец, который танцует для тебя обыкновенная деревянная трещотка) for six percussionists (1991)
Gerade und ungerade (Чет и нечет) for seven percussionists, including cymbalom (1991)
Silenzio for bayan, violin, and cello (1991)
Tartarische Tanz for bayan and two contrabass (1992)
Dancer on a Tightrope (Der Seiltänzer) for violin and string piano (1993)
Meditation über den Bach-Choral "Vor deinen Thron tret' ich hiermit" for harpsichord, two violins, viola, cello, and contrabass (1993)
... Early in the Morning, Right before Waking ... for three 17-string Japanese bass kotos and four 13-string Japanese kotos (1993)
String Quartet No. 4 (a triple quartet for quartet, two taped quartets and ad libitum colored lights, dedicated to the Kronos Quartet) (1993)
In Erwartung (В ожидании) for saxophone quartet and six percussionists (1994)
Aus der Visionen der Hildegard von Bingen for alto (1994)
Quaternion for cello quartet (1996)
Risonanza for three trumpets, four trombones, organ, and six strings (2001)
Reflections on the theme B–A–C–H for string quartet (2002)
Mirage: The Dancing Sun for eight violoncelli (2002)
On the Edge of Abyss for seven violoncelli and two waterphones (2002)
Verwandlung (Transformation) for trombone, saxophone quartet, cello, double bass, and tam-tam (2005)
The Lyre of Orpheus for violin, percussion, and strings (2006)
Ravvedimento for cello and quartet of guitars (2007)
Pentimento, an arrangement for double-bass and three guitars (2007)
Repentance, an arrangement for cello, double-bass and three guitars (2008)
Fantasia on the Theme S–H–E–A for two pianos tuned a quarter-tone apart (2008)
 Sotto voce, for viola, double-bass and two guitars (2010/2013)
Labyrinth, for 12 celli (2011)
So sei es, for violin, double-bass, piano, and percussion (2013)
Pilgrims for violin, double bass, piano and two percussionists (2014)
Einfaches Gebet, Low Mass for narrator, two celli, double bass, piano and two percussionists (2016)

Arrangements
Le Grand Tango by Astor Piazzolla, for violin and piano (1995)

Film scores (partial list from more than 30 films)
Gubaidulina considers the following four works the most important in this genre:
The Circus Tent by Ideya Garanina (1981)
Veliki Samoyed by Arkadi Kordon (1981)
The University Chair by Ivan Kiasashvili (1982)
The Scarecrow by Rolan Bykov (1984)

Other works include:
Adventures of Mowgli (1967–1971)
The Kreutzer Sonata (1987)
The Cat Who Walked by Herself (1988)
Mary Queen Of Scots (2013)

A more complete list of her scores for animated films may be found on her profile at Animator.ru.

Discography 
Solo Piano Works (1994: Sony SK 53960). "Chaconne" (1962), "Sonata" (1965) and "Musical Toys" (1968), performed by Andreas Haefliger, and "Introitus": Concerto for Piano and Chamber Orchestra (1978), Andreas Haefliger with the NDR Radiophilharmonie conducted by Bernhard Klee.
The Canticle of the Sun (1997) and Music for Flute, Strings, and Percussion (1994). The first performed by cellist and conductor Mstislav Rostropovich and London Voices conducted by Ryusuke Numajiri, the second by flutist Emmanuel Pahud and the London Symphony Orchestra conducted by Rostropovich. Gubaidulina attended the recording of both pieces.
Johannes-Passion (2000). Performed by Natalia Korneva, soprano; Viktor Lutsiuk, tenor; Fedor Mozhaev, baritone; Genady Bezzubenkov, bass; Saint Petersburg Chamber Choir (dir. Nikolai Kornev); Choir of the Mariinsky Theatre Saint Petersburg (dir. Andrei Petrenko); Mariinsky Theatre Orchestra Saint Petersburg conducted by Valery Gergiev. World premiere recorded live at the European Music Festival in Stuttgart, September 9, 2000.

References

Sources

External links
Classical.net: Sofia Gubaidulina
Schirmer: Sofia Gubaidulina
 Hans Sikorski: Sofia Gubaidulina

 Sofia Gubaidulina on the Official site of the Moscow Regiment
 Sofia Gubaidulina on the Site "Krugosvet"
 Interview with Sofia Gubaidulina, 18 April 1997
 

1931 births
20th-century classical composers
21st-century classical composers
Deutsche Grammophon artists
Eastern Orthodox Christians from Russia
German electronic musicians
Knights Commander of the Order of Merit of the Federal Republic of Germany
Living people
Members of the Academy of Arts, Berlin
Kazan Conservatory alumni
Moscow Conservatory alumni
People from Chistopol
Recipients of the Léonie Sonning Music Prize
Recipients of the Pour le Mérite (civil class)
Recipients of the Praemium Imperiale
Royal Philharmonic Society Gold Medallists
Russian classical composers
Russian expatriates in Germany
Russian women classical composers
Russian Orthodox Christians from Russia
Soviet women classical composers
Tatar Christians
Tatar people of Russia
Volga Tatar people
Tatar composers
20th-century women composers
21st-century women composers
Tatar people of the Soviet Union
Musicians from Tatarstan